The 1982 season was Molde's 9th season in the top flight of Norwegian football and their first since their promotion from 2. divisjon in 1981. This season Molde competed in 1. divisjon (first tier) and the Norwegian Cup.

In the league, Molde finished in 12th position, 13 points behind winners Viking and were relegated to 2. divisjon.

Molde participated in the 1982 Norwegian Cup. On 19 September, they reached the first final in club history after their 1–0 win away against Viking at Stavanger Stadion. The team lost the final 2–3 against Brann at Ullevaal Stadion on 24 October. Rune Ulvestad and Steinar Henden scored Molde's goals in the final.

Squad
Source:

Friendlies

Competitions

1. divisjon

Results summary

Positions by round

Results

League table

Norwegian Cup

Final

Squad statistics

Appearances and goals
Lacking information:
Appearance statistics from Norwegian Cup rounds 1–4 and semi-finals are missing.

 

|}

Goalscorers

See also
Molde FK seasons

References

External links 
nifs.no

1982
Molde